Reddish Township is an inactive township in Lewis County, in the U.S. state of Missouri.

Reddish Township was established in 1841, taking its name from Silas Reddish, a pioneer citizen.

References

Townships in Missouri
Townships in Lewis County, Missouri